Find a Place to Die (aka Joe... cercati un posto per morire!) is a 1968 Spaghetti Western film starring Jeffrey Hunter and  Pascale Petit. It was co-written and directed by Giuliano Carnimeo (credited as Anthony Ascott) with sequences directed by Hugo Fregonese who also produced the film.

Story
A remake of 1954's Garden of Evil. A beautiful woman recruits five men to help save her husband trapped in their gold mine menaced by a vicious gang of bandits led by Chato.  One of the five men is a member of the gang, another sells weapons to Chato. They are joined by a man professing to be a pastor.  All of the party want the gold and the woman for themselves.

Cast
Jeffrey Hunter as Joe Collins
Pascale Petit as Lisa Martin
Piero Lulli (Peter Lull) as Paul Martin
Reza Fazeli as Paco
Daniela Giordano as Juanita
Adolfo Lastretti (Peter Lastrett) as Reverend Riley
Giovanni Pallavicino (Gordon York) as Gomez
Giovanni Pazzafini (Ted Carter) as Fernando
Mario Darndanelli (Mario Darnell) as Chato
Seraphino Profuno as Miguel
Anthony Blond as Bobo
Umberto Di Grazia as bandit
Pietro Ceccarelli

Production
Hunter had a financial interest in the picture, and controlled its initial distribution in the United States.

This was one of Hunter's last films. He died in 1969.

References

External links

Find a Place to Die at Variety Distribution

1968 films
Spaghetti Western films
1968 Western (genre) films
Films directed by Giuliano Carnimeo
Films directed by Hugo Fregonese
Films scored by Gianni Ferrio
1960s Italian films